Senator Kagan may refer to:

Cheryl Kagan (born 1961), Maryland State Senate
Daniel Kagan (born 1953), Colorado State Senate